GPAC may refer to

Geelong Arts Centre (formerly Geelong Performing Arts Centre), an arts centre in Geelong, Victoria, Australia
General purpose analog computer, a mathematical model of analog computers
GPAC Project on Advanced Content, an open source multimedia framework for research and academic purposes
Great Plains Athletic Conference, a college athletic conference in the United States

See also

GCAP (disambiguation)

GenderPAC, a gay/lesbian/transgender political action committee based in Washington, D.C.